Primero soy mexicano ("First I am Mexican") is a 1950 Mexican drama-comedy film starring Joaquín Pardavé (who also wrote and directed it), Luis Aguilar, and Flor Silvestre.

Synopsis
Old hacendado don Ambrosio awaits the return of his son Rafael after ten years of studying medicine in the US. The hitherto illiterate Ambrosio is taught reading and writing by his orphaned goddaughter Lupe. When Rafael arrives, he seems to forget to be mexicano ("Mexican") and to be ashamed of his Mexican roots, for he refuses to be served "mole" and asks, rather, for ham and eggs. He is suddenly attracted by Lupe, his father's goddaughter and seduces her. Ambrosio learns that she is pregnant, unbeknownst to Rafael. When Rafael plans to marry Sarita, a high-class lady, Ambrosio and Lupe head to Mexico City to reveal the truth and to prevent Rafael from marrying. He eventually does not marry Sarita, but Fabián (Ambrosio's foreman) is in love with Lupe and is willing to marry her, even though the child is Rafael's. In the end Rafael again recognises his Mexicanness and then proposes marriage to Lupe; Ambrosio is content.

Cast
Joaquín Pardavé as don Ambrosio Fuentes
Luis Aguilar - Rafael Fuentes
Flor Silvestre - Lupe	
Arturo Soto Rangel - don Matías		
Lupe Inclán - Chona		
Felipe Montoya		
Francisco Avitia - Fabián
José Chávez (uncredited)
José Escanero (uncredited)
Raúl Guerrero (uncredited)
Elodia Hernández - Sarita's mother (uncredited)
Gloria Mange - Sarita (uncredited)
Pepe Nava (uncredited)
Humberto Rodríguez (uncredited)
Hernán Vera (uncredited)

Production
The film marks singer Flor Silvestre's first starring role, after having appeared in Te besaré en la boca (1950) in a small role. Primero soy mexicano also appears to have been Francisco "Charro" Avitia's first incursion in Mexican cinema. The film was the thirteenth Pardavé directed; it was filmed with a Mitchell camera.

References

External links

1950 films
Mexican comedy-drama films
1950 comedy-drama films
Mexican black-and-white films
1950s Mexican films